Fritz Schneider may refer to:

 Fritz Schneider (ski jumper) (born 1928), Swiss ski jumper 
 Fritz Schneider (footballer), Swiss footballer

See also
 Fritz Scheider, German water polo player